Rodolfo De Jonge (born 1909, date of death unknown) was an Argentine footballer. He played in four matches for the Argentina national football team from 1931 to 1935. He was also part of Argentina's squad for the 1935 South American Championship.

References

External links
 

1909 births
Year of death missing
Argentine footballers
Argentina international footballers
Place of birth missing
Association football defenders
Defensores de Belgrano footballers
Club Atlético Independiente footballers